Friedrich Julius Wilhelm Graf von Bose (12 September 1809 – 22 July 1894) was a Prussian general who commanded the Prussian XI Corps during the Franco-Prussian War.

In 1821 Bose was a page boy at the court of Weimar. Bose entered the Prussian 26th Infantry Regiment in 1826. He became an officer in 1829. From 1832 to 1835 he studied at the Prussian Military Academy, which was a prerequisite to joining the General Staff. Bose served as an adjutant in various positions from 1835 to 1852. In 1853 he became a major on the General Staff. In 1858 Bose became chief of staff of the IV Corps. In 1860 he was promoted to colonel and given command of a regiment of infantry. A year later he was given a position in the Prussian war ministry.

Bose was promoted to major general in 1864. During the Austro-Prussian War Bose commanded the 15th Infantry Brigade, with which he distinguished himself at Podol, Münchengrätz and Sadowa. At the end of the war Bose was promoted to lieutenant-general and given command of the 20th Infantry Division. When the Franco-Prussian War started in August 1870, Bose was given command of the XI Corps, with which he served at the battle of Wörth where he was wounded. His wounds kept him out of the war until 1871.

For his services during the war he was given a donative of 100.000 thaler. In 1880 he was ennobled a count.

Awards and decorations
  Kingdom of Prussia:
 Knight of Honour of the Johanniter Order, 19 January 1854
 Knight of the Royal Order of the Crown, 2nd Class, 22 September 1863
 Pour le Mérite (military), 20 September 1866
 Iron Cross (1870), 1st and 2nd Classes
 Knight of the Order of the Red Eagle, 1st Class with Oak Leaves and Swords, 1871; Grand Cross with Swords on Ring, 12 September 1874
 Knight of the Order of the Black Eagle, 5 October 1876; with Collar, 1878
 Grand Commander's Cross of the Royal House Order of Hohenzollern, with Star, 24 September 1878
 : Grand Cross of the Merit Order of Philip the Magnanimous, 17 June 1873
 :
 Commander of the Order of the Württemberg Crown, 1863
 Grand Cross of the Military Merit Order, 28 February 1871
 :
 Knight of the Imperial Order of the Iron Crown, 3rd Class, 15 June 1852
 Knight of the Austrian Imperial Order of Leopold, 19 December 1863
 :
 Knight of the Imperial Order of St. Anna, 2nd Class, 11 June 1864
 Knight of the Imperial Order of St. Alexander Nevsky, 24 June 1875
 : Commander of the Royal Order of the Sword with Star

References
 Herrmann, Otto, Julius von Bose: preussischer General der Infanterie; eine Lebensbeschreibung nach amtlichen Quellen und privaten Mitteilungen, Verlag A. Bath, 1898.
 Howard, Michael, The Franco-Prussian War: The German Invasion of France 1870–1871, New York: Routledge, 2001. .
 Poten, Bernhard von, Bose, Julius von in Allgemeine Deutsche Biographie (ADB). Band 47, Duncker & Humblot, Leipzig 1903, S. 135–137.
 Wawro, Geoffrey, The Austro-Prussian War. Austria's war with Prussia and Italy in 1866 (New York 2007), p. 131-135.

Notes

Citations

1809 births
1894 deaths
People from Sangerhausen
German military personnel of the Franco-Prussian War
Prussian people of the Austro-Prussian War
Generals of Infantry (Prussia)
Recipients of the Pour le Mérite (military class)
Commanders of the Order of the Sword
Recipients of the Order of St. Anna, 2nd class
Recipients of the Iron Cross (1870), 1st class
Military personnel from Saxony-Anhalt